The Newton County Library System (NCLS) is a consortium of three public libraries in Newton County, Georgia, United States. The system has libraries in both Covington and Newborn, Georgia.

NCLS is a member of PINES, a program of the Georgia Public Library Service that covers 53 library systems in 143 counties of Georgia. Any resident in a PINES supported library system has access to over 10.6 million books in the system's circulation. The library is also serviced by GALILEO, a program of the University System of Georgia which stands for "GeorgiA LIbrary LEarning Online". This program offers residents in supported libraries access to over 100 databases indexing thousands of periodicals and scholarly journals. It also boasts over 10,000 journal titles in full text.

History

Early history
The Newton County Library System began in 1916 as a public library service offered by the Covington Womans Club and housed in their own building. This is the only known library in the county during this time until 1944, when plans were made for an official public library to be used by the town. This library was opened and served out of the basement of the Newton County Courthouse.

DeKalb Regional Library System
In 1953 Newton County joined DeKalb and Rockdale counties to make a three-county library system then called the DeKalb Regional Library System. Working as a consortium, rather than independently, these three growing counties allowed their residents a much wider circulation of volumes, which helped increase interest in each town's local library.

Due to increased interest, the Newton branch moved out of the county courthouse and into the Covington Gymnasium to increase the amount of space available for books. By 1978 space was no longer an issue, as the James H. Porter Foundation funded the renovation of the local post office into the Porter Memorial Library.

After a few decades of growth, the individual counties in the DeKalb Regional Library System were able to become self-sufficient. The consortium was dissolved in 1989 and led to the formation of the individual county systems which stand today.

Present day
In 2000 the NCLS joined PINES, a state-wide consortium of public libraries working towards the goal of providing easier access to books for Georgians.

In 2008 the Newborn branch library joined the library system, which also received funding to create the Porter Memorial Branch Library.

Branches

Library systems in neighboring counties
Azalea Regional Library System to the east
Flint River Regional Library System to the south
Henry County Library System to the west
Conyers-Rockdale Library System to the northwest

References

External links
PINES catalog

County library systems in Georgia (U.S. state)
Public libraries in Georgia (U.S. state)